Konstanty may refer to:

given name:
 Konstanty Adam Czartoryski (1777–1866), Polish prince, Brigadier General 
 Konstanty Andrzej Kulka (born 1947), Polish violinist, recording artist, and professor 
 Konstanty Borzęcki (1826–1876), participant in Polish and Ottoman uprisings, known as Mustafa Celalettin Pasha
 Konstanty Brandel (1880–1970), Polish painter, notable contributor to the Young Poland movement
 Konstanty Branicki (1824–1884), Polish collector and naturalist who established a private museum of natural history
 Konstanty Budkiewicz (1867-1923), Roman Catholic priest executed by the OGPU for organizing Nonviolent resistance against the First Soviet anti-religious campaign
 Konstanty Ciołkowski (1857–1935), Soviet with Polish origin rocket scientist who pioneered astronautic theory
 Konstanty Dombrowicz (born 1947), Polish journalist, politician and President of Bydgoszcz
 Konstanty Gebert (born 1953), Polish-Jewish journalist and activist
 Konstanty Gorski (1859–1924), Polish composer, violinist, organist
 Konstanty Górski (1868–1934), Polish painter and illustrator
 Konstanty Hrynakowski (1878–1938), Polish chemist
 Konstanty Ildefons Gałczyński (1905–1953), Polish poet
 Konstanty Jacek Lubomirski (1620–1663), Polish prince
 Konstanty Jeleński (1922-1987), Polish essayist
 Konstanty Jelski (1837–1896), Polish ornithologist and zoologist who explored French Guiana
 Konstanty Jodko-Narkiewicz (1901–1963), Polish geophysicist who specialized in studying cosmic radiation
 Konstanty Kaiszauri (born 1952), Poland born Swedish chess International Master
 Konstanty Kalinowski (1838–1864), Polish-Belarusian writer, journalist, lawyer and revolutionary
 Konstanty Kapuścik (dead 1943), member of the Gestapo killed by a partisan death squad, known as Helmut Kapp
 Konstanty Kazimierz Brzostowski (1644–1722), Polish noble, count of the Holy See, and papal prelate
 Konstanty Kurnatowski (1878-1968), bishop
 Konstanty Korniakt (1517–1603), Polish merchant of Greek descent
 Konstanty Korniakt of Białobok (1582-1624), Polish nobleman and soldier
 Konstanty Laszczka (1865–1956), Polish sculptor, painter, professor and rector of the Jan Matejko Academy of Fine Arts in Kraków
 Konstanty Ludwik Plater (1722–1778), Polish noble, Castellan and voivode
 Konstanty Mackiewicz (1894–1985), Polish painter
 Konstanty Majeranowski (1787–1851), Polish journalist, poet 
 Konstanty Maria Sopoćko (1903-1992), Polish artist, specializing in woodcutting
 Konstanty Miodowicz (1951–2013), Polish politician
 Konstanty Ostrogski (1460-1530), Grand Hetman of Lithuania 
 Konstanty Plisowski (1890–1940), Polish general and military commander
 Konstanty Pociejkewicz (1932–2003), Polish speedway rider 
 Konstanty Radziwiłł (born 1958), Polish politician, physician
 Konstanty Rokicki (1899–1958), Polish consular officer, Righteous Among the Nations
 Konstanty Rokossowski (1896–1968), Soviet and Polish officer, Marshal of the Soviet Union of Poland
 Konstanty Szyrwid (1579–1631), religious preacher, lexicographer and one of the pioneers of Lithuanian literature
 Konstanty Skirmunt (1866–1949), Polish politician
 Konstanty Troczyński (1906-1942), Polish literature theoretician and critic, murdered in the German concentration camp Auschwitz
 Konstanty Tyszkiewicz (1806–1868), Polish-Lithuanian noble, archaeologist and ethnographer
 Konstanty Tyzenhauz (1786–1853), Polish-Lithuanian nobleman, naturalist, artist, and sponsor of ornithology 
 Konstanty Wasyl Ostrogski (1526-1608), prince, Ruthenian Orthodox magnate of the Polish–Lithuanian Commonwealth
 Konstanty Wileński (born 1949), Polish-Ukrainian pianist, composer and jazz musician
 Konstanty Wiśniowiecki (1564–1641), Polish nobleman, voivode of Belz 
 Konstanty Władysław Sobieski (1680–28 February 1726), Polish prince, son of John III Sobieski
 Konstanty Zakrzewski (1876–1948), Polish physicist
 Konstanty Zamoyski (1799-1866), Polish nobleman
 Konstanty Zamoyski Palace

second given name:
 Gustaw Konstanty Orlicz-Dreszer (1889−1936), Polish general, political and social activist
 Jerzy Konstanty Broel-Plater (1810–1836), bibliographer and researcher of the Lithuanian language and literature
 Jerzy Konstanty Czartoryski (1828–1912), Polish noble and politician
 Józef Konstanty Olszyna-Wilczyński (1890–1939), Polish general
 Juliusz Konstanty Ordon (1810-1887), participant of the Polish November Uprising
 Mikołaj Konstanty Czurlanis (1875–1911), Lithuanian painter, composer and writer
 Teodor Konstanty Lubomirski (1683–1745), Polish prince
 Władysław Konstanty Vasa, Count of Wasenau (1635–1698), illegitimate son of Władysław IV Vasa 

last name:
 Jim Konstanty (1917-1976), American professional baseball player